This is a list of Motorola products. Motorola Mobility is an American subsidiary company of Chinese multinational technology company Lenovo that manufactures consumer electronics and telecommunications products.

Computers

Laptops

 ML910
 MW810
 MW800
 ML900
 ML850
 ML950
MNope2

Handheld
 HC700 series
 Symbol Technologies line of products
 HYT
 ICOM
 Motorola
 MotoG

Mobile VHF UHF Two way Radio
 Motorola VHF MT 1000
 Motorola UHF GP 388 GP 388
 Motorola VHF GM 300
 Motorola VHF UHF Repeater MSR 2000, GR 500, MTR 2000

StarMax

 StarMax 3000
 StarMax 4000
 StarMax 5000
 StarMax 5500

Home and consumer products
 Vintage radio and television receivers
 Follow Me TV
 m25 (256 MB) and m500 (5 GB) digital audio players
 iRadio music subscription service

Cordless phones

 C series: C50, C51, C51, C70
 E series: E30, E31, E32, E33, E34, E51, E51, E52
 T series: T31
 MA3100 series (2.4 GHz): MA3153, MA3163
 MD4100 series (2.4 GHz digital): MD4153, MD4163
 MD600 series (5.8 GHz digital): MD671, MD681, MA681, MA61
 "Disney phones"

Home monitoring and automation
Homesight

Cameras
HMVC3050
HMVC3075
HMVC3020

Semiconductors
Note: , these are part of the product portfolio of Freescale Semiconductor, Inc.  Please see the List of Freescale products for more information.

Wireless communications

Data networks
 Canopy – A line-of-sight wireless technology, primarily used by ISPs to provide broadband internet
 MotoMESH – A mobile wireless broadband product providing proprietary "Mesh-Enabled Architecture" and standards-based 802.11 network access in both the unlicensed 2.4 GHz band and the licensed 4.9 GHz public-safety band
 HotZone Duo – Meshed wireless broadband networking product supporting both 2.4 GHz 802.11b/g and 5.8 GHz 802.11a standards.  The system supports 802.11e for quality of service management, and is planned to support the 802.11s standard for mesh networking once that standard is finalized
 Orthogon Systems – wireless, non-line-of-sight (NLOS), point-to-point Ethernet bridges
 WiMax Wi4 –  GAP, DAP & SAAP Systems. Base Stations based on the recent WiMAX technology. Pointed to Wireless BroadBand Access and Internet.

Mobile network carrier infrastructure
 ASTRO 25 – implementation of APCO Project 25
 BSC (GSM)
 Dimetra – proprietary implementation of TETRA
 Horizon 2 Macro BTS (GSM)
 Horizon 2 Mini BTS (GSM)
 MSS – Mobile Soft Switch (Multiple Technologies)
 PCU (GSM)
 RXCDR (GSM)

Mobile telephones
 Status: D = discontinued; P = in production

Classic (1983-1998)

A series feature phones (1999-2010)

A series smartphones (1999-2010)

C series (1998-2006)

E series (2004-2006)

Timeport series (1999-2003)

iDEN/CDMA dual-mode a.k.a. Cobra
See also: Integrated Digital Enhanced Network (iDEN), Code division multiple access (CDMA)

Eagle series

Condor series (1999-2003)

Falcon series (2003-2011)

M series (2004-2008)

M series smartphones

MS series

Q series smartphones (2005-2008)

T series (1999-2006)

V series (1998-2008)

W series (2006-2010)

WX series (2009-2013)

Four Letter (4LTR) series (2004-)

Android Smartphones (2009–)

Mobile phone accessories 
 Motorola TXTR

Smartwatches
 Motoactv (2011)
 Moto 360 (2014)
 Moto 360 (2015)
 Moto 360 Sport

Accessories

Bluetooth

HT820 Bluetooth stereo wireless headset
HF850 Bluetooth Car Adapter
H3-bluetooth Bluetooth Headset
H350 Bluetooth Headset
H500  Bluetooth Headset
H605 Bluetooth Headset
H700 Bluetooth Headset
HS805 Bluetooth Headset
HS815 Bluetooth Headset
HS820 Bluetooth Headset
HS830 Bluetooth Headset
HS850 Bluetooth Headset
S9 Stereo Bluetooth Headset
EQ5 Stereo Bluetooth Speaker

Wired
P000 Y-splitter USB adapter
GP300 Portable Radio
GP340 Portable Radio
GP360/380 Portable Radio
GP68 Portable Radio
GP328/HT750 Portable Radio
GP338/339 Portable Radio
GM360/380 Mobile Radio
Visar Portable Radio
MT1000 Portable Radio
MT500 Portable Radio
HT1000 Portable Radio
MT2000 Portable Radio
MTS2000 Portable radio
DP/DM Series Portable/Mobile DMR Radio

Pagers

Tone and voice
Motorola Pageboy
Motorola METRX
Pageboy II
 AT&T Bellboy
 AT&T Bellboy II
 Dimension IV
 Motorola Director
 Director II
 Motorola BPR2000
 Motorola Sensar
 Motorola Gold Line Pen Pager

Numeric
Bravo Alpha
Bravo/Lifestyle
Bravo Classic
Bravo FLX/Pro Encore
Bravo Instinct
Bravo Lx/Encore
Bravo Plus
BR850
eXpress Xtra
eXpress Xtra FLX
GoldLine Pen
 Motorola Sensar DTMF
LS350
LS550
LS750
Pronto
Pronto FLX
Renegade
Ultra Express

Alphanumeric
Advisor
Advisor Elite
Advisor Gold
Advisor Pro
Everest
Memo Express
Motorola Optrx
Jazz
Jazz Flex
Scriptor
Scriptor Linguist
PageFinder
CP1250

Message senders
AlphaMate
QuickWORD
WordSender
WordTrek
WordTrek Plus

Two-Way Message Pagers
Tango
T900
PF1500
9501 (Iridium Satellite Pager)
 PageWriter 2000

Voice
PR2000
PR3000
PR5000

Fire pagers
Motorola BMD pager
Motorola MINITOR pager
MINITOR II
MINITOR III
MINITOR IV
MINITOR V
Motorola PageBoy I
Motorola PageBoy II
Motorola Skyfire
Motorola Skyfire II

Two-way radios

Mobile radios
APX 7500 (The first "Dual-Band" Offering)
APX 6500 (A single-band version of APX 7500)
ASTRO Spectra
ASTRO Spectra Plus (Offered XTL features in an ASTRO Spectra package)
CDM750
CDM1250
CDM1550
CLS1413
GM300 (6, 8 or 16 channels)
M10 (a single channel GM300)
M120 (a two channel GM300)
M130 (a two channel GM300)
Maratrac
Maxtrac
Maxar
MC Micro
Motrar (Trunked version of the Maxar)
Micom (HF SSB Series)
Micor
Mitrek
Motrek
Mocom
Mostar
Mototrbo/XPR Series (ETSI DMR Series)
Motrac
Moxy
MCS 2000
Radius M10, M110, M120, M206, M208, M216, GM300
Spectra
Syntor, Syntor X, Syntor X9000
T-power
Traxar
Syntrx
Syntrx Plus
XTL 1500
XTL 2500
XTL 5000
XPR 5550
XPR 5350
XPR 5580
XPR 5380

Portable radios
SCR-536
APX
BPR 40
DTR 650
HT-100
HT 200
HT 220
MT-500
MX-300, MX-300S
HT 90, HT 440
HT600, HT600E, HT800, MT1000, MTX800, MTX810, MTX900, and P200
GP300
GP900, GP1200, HT1000, HT1100, JT1000, MT2000, MT2100, MTS-LS, MTX838, MTX2000, MTX8000, MTX9000, MTS2000, MTS2010, MTS2013, PTX1200, and PTX3600
STX
GTX
ASTRO Digital Saber
Systems Saber
European Saber MX 1000, MX 2000, MX 3000, Stornophone 7000
Talkabout
TLKR Series
Visar
HT 750, HT 1250, HT 1550
WHK-R Series
XTS Series
XPR series
Spirit
Radius GP 300

Infrastructure

Base stations 
 Fixed Voice-Only Base Stations
MICOR Base Station (Voice)
MDB Base Station (Voice)
MSY Base Station (Voice)
MTR 300 Base Station (Voice)
MTR 2000 Base Station (Voice)
MSR 2000 Base Station (Voice)
MSF 5000 Base Station (Voice)
MCR 100 / Radius R100 Base Station (Voice)
GR 1225 / RKR 1225 Base Station (Voice)
 Data Base Stations
Gemini Base Station (MDC4800 Data)
DataTAC DSS-III Base Station (Data)
MSF 5000 DBS (Data Base Station)
Quantar DBS (Data Base Station)
 Integrated Voice & Data Stations (IV&D)
Quantro Base Station (Voice & Data)
Quantar Base Station (Voice & Data)
MTR 3000 Base Station (Voice & Data)
GTR 8000 Base Station (Voice & Data)
 Transportable Base Stations
XTVA Transportable Base Station (Analog & Digital Voice)
MX-based Suitcase Repeater (Analog/CVSD Encrypted Voice)
PDR 3500 Suitcase Repeater (Analog & Digital Voice)
 Paging Base Stations
MICOR PURC Paging Station (Based on the MICOR Product)
PURC 5000 Paging Station  (Based on the MSF 5000 Product)
NUCLEUS Paging Station
NUCLEUS II Paging Station
PeopleFinder series on-site Paging Stations

Fixed Repeaters
ATS Cumulative Repeater
MSY Repeater Station (Based on the MOTRAC design)
MICOR Repeater Station
GR 300 (Based on two GM 300 Mobile Radios)
GR 500 (Based on two GM 300 Mobile Radios)
GR 1225 / RKR 1225 Conventional Repeaters
MCR 100 / Radius R100 Conventional Repeaters
GTR 8000 Conventional & Trunked Repeater
MSR 2000 Conventional Repeater
MTR 2000 Conventional & Trunked Repeater
MTR 3000 Conventional & Trunked Repeater
MSF 5000 Conventional & Trunked Repeater
PDR 3500 Portable Analog & P25 Repeater
Quantar Conventional & Trunked Repeater
Quantro Conventional & Trunked Repeater
XPR 8300 Conventional & Trunked Repeater
XPR 8400 Conventional & Trunked Repeater

 Vehicle-based Repeaters
PAC, PAC-PL & PAC-RT Mobile Repeaters
VRS•EP Mobile Repeater
VRS 750 Mobile Repeater
Futurecom DVRS Mobile Repeater (a third-party product)

Site & Zone Controllers
6809 Trunked Central Controller (SmartNET, SmartZone Prime & Remote)
MTC 3600 SmartNET/SmartZone 4.1 Controller (Prime & Remote)
PSC 9600 Astro25 6.x Site Controller (Remote Sites)
MTC 9600 ASTRO25 Site Controller (Prime Sites)
GCP 8000 ASTRO25 Site Controller (Prime & Remote Sites)
MZC 3000 SmartZone 4.1 Zone Controller (4.1 Master Sites)
MZC 5000 Astro25 7.x Zone Controller (7.x Master Sites)

Voting Comparators
TAC (Total Area Coverage) Voting Comparator (Supporting analog calls)
SpectraTAC Voting Comparator (Supporting analog calls)
SECURENET DIGITAC Voting Comparator (Supporting analog & CVSD encrypted calls)
ASTROTAC Comparator (Supporting VSELP & IMBE (P25) Digital Calls)
ASTROTAC 3000 Voting Comparator (Supporting analog & IMBE (P25) Digital calls)
GCM 8000 Voting Comparator (Supporting Astro25 Trunked & Conventional)
MLC 8000 Voting Comparator (Supporting P25 & Analog calls)

Satellite and Auxiliary Receivers
TAC Satellite Receiver (Based on the MOTRAC Receiver Design)
SpectraTAC Satellite Receiver (Based on the MICOR Receiver Design)
MSF 5000 Satellite Receiver (a receive-only version of the MSF 5000 Base Station)
MTR 2000 Satellite Receiver (a receive-only version of the MTR 2000 Base Station)
ASTROTAC Satellite Receiver (Based on the Quantar Receiver Design)
Quantar Satellite Receiver (a receive-only version of the Quantar Base Station)
MTR 3000 Satellite Receiver (an analog, receive-only version of the MTR 3000 Base Station)
GPW 8000 Satellite Receiver (a receive-only version of the GTR 8000 Base Station)

Telemetry Radios
Motorola APCOR (Advanced Portable Coronary Observation Radio)
RNET Telemetry Radio

Other wireless
 MeshTrack – An integrated non-GPS location system and data network that can be deployed to incident sites by public safety organizations
 Motorola Bag Phone was a portable Cellular Telephone manufactured by Motorola, inc. from 1992 to 2000

Wireline communications

Cable TV and broadband
In 2012, Motorola Mobility's home unit was acquired by Arris Group, which includes set-top boxes (e.g. VIP series), and SURFboard cable modems.

TV receivers

 DCT2000
 DCT6412 HDTV DVR
 DCT3412 HDTV digital tuner

Cable modems

 SURFboard SB3100 cable modem
 SURFboard SB4100 cable modem
 SURFboard SB4200 cable modem
 SURFboard SB5100 cable modem
 SURFboard SB5101 cable modem
 SURFboard SB5120 cable modem
 SURFboard SB5102 cable modem
 SURFboard SB6120 cable modem
 SURFboard SB6121 cable modem
 SURFboard SB6141 cable modem
 SURFboard SB6180 cable modem
 SURFboard SB6182 cable modem
 SURFboard SB6183 cable modem
 SURFboard SB6220 cable modem
 MB7220 cable modem
 MB7420 cable modem
 SURFboard SBV5121 voice cable modem
 SURFboard SBV5122 voice cable modem
 SBG900 wireless cable modem gateway
 SBG900i wireless cable modem gateway
 SBG901 wireless cable modem gateway
 SBG941 wireless cable modem gateway
 SBG6580 wireless cable modem gateway
 SBG6782-AC wireless cable modem gateway
 SBG6900-AC wireless cable modem gateway
 MG7310 wireless cable modem gateway

Voice over IP

 VT1000 and VT1005v analog telephony adapters.  Has been distributed by Vonage.

References

 Greatest Motorola Pager Museum in the World!
 Motorola Mobile Two Way Radios
 Motorola Portable Two Way Radios
 Radio Selection Guide
 Motorola Products and Services page

External links
 More reviews on the Motorola SURFboard SB6121

Motorola products

Motorola
Radio manufacturers